Exile Editions is an independent literary publisher based in Toronto. It was founded in 1976 by poet, novelist and artist Barry Callaghan and is currently headed by Michael Callaghan. Exile has published over 320 titles to date, including a wide array of poetry, fiction and nonfiction by authors from around the world and Canada such as Yehuda Amichai, Pablo Neruda, Morley Callaghan, Colin Carberry, Austin Clarke, Lauren B. Davis, Gwendolyn MacEwen, Michael Moriarty, Joyce Carol Oates, Jon Papernick, Boris Pasternak, Leon Rooke, Jaime Sabines, Priscilla Uppal, and Sean Virgo.

Companies based in Toronto
Literary publishing companies